Wilson Jones may refer to:

Wilson Jones (footballer, born 1914) (1914–1986), Welsh professional footballer
Wilson Jones (footballer, born 1934) (1934–2021), Spanish professional footballer
Wilson Jones (billiards player) (1922–2003), Indian billiards player
Wilson W. Jones, California Gold Rush pioneer settler
Wilson Jones (MP), British Minister of Parliament for Denbigh Boroughs, 1835–1841

See also
Anna Wilson-Jones, British actress